Amália Sterbinszky (born 29 September 1950) is a former Hungarian handball player who was voted the best female handballer of the twentieth century in Hungary.

She competed in two Olympic Games (1976, 1980), winning the bronze medal at the first one. Sterbinszky also collected three bronze medals at the World Championships and crowned her long and successful international career with a silver at the 1982 World event, which was held on home soil.

Sterbinszky finished her career in Denmark, subsequently taking the coaching position of the Danish national team.

Achievements
Nemzeti Bajnokság I:
Winner: 1971, 1973, 1974, 1975, 1976, 1977, 1978, 1979, 1980, 1981, 1982
Magyar Kupa:
Winner: 1970, 1972, 1974, 1976, 1978, 1979, 1980, 1981, 1982
Damehåndboldligaen:
Winner: 1983, 1984
Champions Cup:
Winner: 1982
Finalist: 1971, 1978, 1979
Olympic Games:
Bronze Medalist: 1976
World Championship:
Silver Medalist: 1982
Bronze Medalist: 1971, 1975, 1978

Awards and recognition
 Nemzeti Bajnokság I Top Scorer: 1977
 Hungarian Handballer of the Year: 1974, 1976, 1977
 Golden Ring of Vasas SC: 2006
 Hungarian Handballer of the 20th Century

References

External links
Profile on Database Olympics
Profile on Worldhandball.com

1950 births
Living people
Sportspeople from Hajdú-Bihar County
Hungarian female handball players
Handball players at the 1976 Summer Olympics
Handball players at the 1980 Summer Olympics
Olympic handball players of Hungary
Olympic bronze medalists for Hungary
Olympic medalists in handball
Expatriate handball players
Hungarian expatriates in Denmark
Medalists at the 1976 Summer Olympics